Yusmary Mercedes Pérez Medina (born 10 November 1980) is a Venezuelan softball player. She competed in the women's tournament at the 2008 Summer Olympics.

References

External links
 

1980 births
Living people
People from Acarigua
Venezuelan softball players
Olympic softball players of Venezuela
Softball players at the 2008 Summer Olympics
Competitors at the 2013 World Games
World Games silver medalists
World Games medalists in softball
21st-century Venezuelan people